The Pitapita or Pitta Pitta are an Aboriginal Australian people of the state of Queensland.

Language

They spoke Pitapita, one of the Karnic languages, which remains the best described dialect of an eastern group that comprised also Rangwa, Kunkalanya, Ngulupulu and Ringa-Ringa. It is otherwise closely related to the Western group consisting of Wangkajutjuru/Wangka-Yutjurru and Lhanima.

Country
The Pitapita's precise geographical borders are not known, since the earliest detailed account of them, by Walter Roth, included numerous subtribes and hordes in a somewhat confusing presentation.

Their land was adjacent to the Wanggamala people.

History of contact
Opening up the country to white settlement led to the displacement of numerous tribes in the area from their traditional grounds, and "with privation, disease, alcohol and lead", whole communities were annihilated. By the time of his sojourn at Boulia, Roth goes on to estimate that, as with most tribes in the area, the Pitapita were suffering from a rapid demographic collapse, and he stated that no more than 200 probably remained in the whole of the district.

Native title

Social organisation and rites
The Pitapita practised both circumcision and subincision as part of their initiatory rites.

Alternative names
 Bitta Bitta
 Pittapitta
 Wangkahicho
 Wangkahichs. (typo)
 Wangkapit:a

Source:

Some words
 amma (mother)
 apari. (father)
 munga (tame dog)
 punamya. (wild dog)
 tita. (whiteman)

Source:

Notes

Citations

Sources

Aboriginal peoples of Queensland